Ngô Chân Lưu (933–1011), title Khuông Việt, was a Vietnamese Buddhist monk and poet.

He wrote some of the earliest works by any Vietnamese writer, but wrote in Chinese, the language of the Vietnamese literati and Confucian scholars. His Ngọc Lang Quy, a farewell to Lý Giác, is one of the first works of Chữ Nho tradition of Vietnamese literature.

References

933 births
1011 deaths
Vietnamese male poets
Buddhist poets
11th-century Vietnamese poets
10th-century Vietnamese poets
Lý dynasty Buddhist monks